Entrust, formerly named Auckland Energy Consumer Trust (AECT) prior to June 2016, is a trust for electricity consumers in Auckland, New Zealand. Formed in 1993 as sole owner of the original Mercury Energy Limited, it is now majority owner of electricity and gas distributor Vector Limited, a child of the original Mercury, the other child being the retailing division of Mercury Energy. The Trust will be wound up in 2073 (80 years after its formation) and its assets transferred to the local government authority or authorities in the Trust district (at present this would be Auckland Council). There have been calls for the Trust to be wound up sooner.

AECT owned 75.1% of the shares in Vector in 2015, worth about $2 billion. It holds the shares on behalf of Vector's 300,000 customers and distributes dividends from Vector to its customers. The remaining 24.9% of Vector shares are traded on the NZX Main Board stock exchange.

As part of electricity industry reforms in 1993, the consumer-owned Auckland Electric Power Board became Mercury Energy Limited and AECT was set up to own it, keeping control in the hands of electricity consumers. Similar trusts were established elsewhere in the country. Mercury was the electricity distributor and retailer for Auckland, Manukau and Papakura. In 1998 the government split the electricity sector into distributors (lines companies) and retailers, and accordingly Mercury was split. The retail business was sold to Mighty River Power and the lines business being kept and renamed Vector Limited. AECT was the sole owner of Vector until 2005, when it allowed Vector to make a public float of 24.9% of its shares to raise capital to buy gas company NGC Holdings.

Election of trustees
  
The trust is run by five trustees elected using the plurality-at-large method every three years in line with the requirements of the Trust Deed. Trustees are electricity customers who live in the Trust area.

The right-leaning C & R – Communities and Residents ticket has dominated election results for the five trust seats in recent years, and under its previous names Citizens & Ratepayers NOW and Citizens & Ratepayers in earlier years. The ticket has long been aligned with the National Party.

2003 election 
2003 trustee election results for the five seats on the trust:

2006 election 
2006 trustee election results for the five seats on the trust:

2009 election 
2009 trustee election results for the five seats on the trust:

2012 election 
2012 trustee election results for the five seats on the trust:

2015 election 
2015 trustee election results for the five seats on the trust:

2018 election 
2018 trustee election results for the five seats on the trust:

2021 election 
2021 trustee election results for the five seats on the trust:

See also
New Zealand electricity market

References

External links
Entrust Website

Energy in New Zealand
Organisations based in Auckland